Troglolestes sokolovi is a species of predatory air-breathing land slug. It is a shell-less pulmonate gastropod mollusc in the family Trigonochlamydidae.

Troglolestes sokolovi is the only species in the genus Troglolestes.

The generic name Troglolestes contains the suffix -lestes, that means "robber".

Distribution 
The distribution of Troglolestes sokolovi includes only its type locality.

The type locality of Troglolestes sokolovi is the Vorontzovskaya Cave near Sochi, Russia.

Ecology 
Troglolestes sokolovi inhabits the cave. Animals inhabiting caves are called troglobites. It was discovered as the first species of troglobite slug in 1965.

References

Trigonochlamydidae